Lytoceras cornucopia is an ammonite species belonging to the family Lytoceratidae. These cephalopods were fast-moving nektonic carnivores. They lived in the Jurassic period.

Description

Distribution
Fossils of species within this genus have been found in the Jurassic rocks of France, Hungary, Italy, Luxembourg and United Kingdom.

References

External links
Ammonites
Whitbymuseum

Jurassic ammonites
Lytoceratidae